Henry Gales  (1834–1897) was an English painter, most well known for his portrait of the 1867 Derby Cabinet.

Biography
Gales was born in Acle, Norfolk, England to Daniel Gales and Mary Church (Daniel's first wife).  After studying in the 1850s at the Norwich School of Design, he moved to London in the 1860s.

In 1868, Gales painted The Derby Cabinet of 1867, an oil painting on canvas depicting Prime Minister Edward Smith-Stanley, 14th Earl of Derby, and his cabinet: Benjamin Disraeli, Richard Temple-Grenville, 3rd Duke of Buckingham and Chandos; Frederic Thesiger, 1st Baron Chelmsford; Henry Thomas Lowry-Corry; Gathorne Gathorne-Hardy, 1st Earl of Cranbrook; Edward Henry Stanley, 15th Earl of Derby; John Pakington, 1st Baron Hampton; Stafford Northcote, 1st Earl of Iddesleigh; James Harris, 3rd Earl of Malmesbury; John Spencer-Churchill, 7th Duke of Marlborough; Richard Bourke, 6th Earl of Mayo; Charles Gordon-Lennox, 6th Duke of Richmond; John Manners, 7th Duke of Rutland; and Spencer Horatio Walpole.  The portrait is said to have been painted to a design by John Gilbert.  It depicts the cabinet in consultation upon the question of the 1868 Expedition to Abyssinia. The Derby Cabinet of 1867 is in the collection of the National Portrait Gallery in London.

Gales married Sarah Richmond of Tasmania in The Stand, London, in 1869.  They had one child, Lilian, born in 1871 in Westminster, London.  Lilian died at the age of three in Kensington, London.  Gales and his wife divorced in 1896.

Gales returned to Norfolk, exhibiting with the Norwich Art Circle during 1888 and 1889.  His name also appears in Kelly's Directory, which describes him as "private resident, artist of Acle Norfolk."

In 1897, Henry Gales died in Great Yarmouth, Norfolk.

Works

References

People from Broadland (district)
1834 births
1897 deaths
19th-century English painters
English male painters
Alumni of Norwich University of the Arts
19th-century English male artists